Call-A.P.P.L.E. is the monthly journal publication of the Apple Pugetsound Program Library Exchange (or A.P.P.L.E.)  The magazine was published from 1978 until 1990 when it was discontinued; after a 12-year lapse publication was restarted in 2002. The magazine has covered most aspects of Apple personal computers; from the Apple I to the latest Macintosh computers with macOS.

Focus
During its original run (1978–1990), the magazine was focused primarily on the Apple II series of computers and related programming content.

Currently the magazine continues to have Apple II programming content but also contains reviews and program information for the other Apple computers including the latest hardware and software releases.

Call-A.P.P.L.E. also covers emulation of older platforms on the newer machines.

See also
Apple Pugetsound Program Library Exchange
List of publications and periodicals devoted to the Apple II

External links
 
 Call A.P.P.L.E Library at the Centre for Computing History
 

Magazines established in 1978
Computer magazines published in the United States
Monthly magazines published in the United States
Apple II periodicals